Roman Inscriptions of Britain is a 3-volume corpus of inscriptions found in Britain from the Roman period. It is an important reference work for all scholars of Roman Britain. This monumental work was initiated by Francis J. Haverfield, whose notebooks were bequeathed to the University of Oxford. The first volume, Inscriptions on Stone, was then edited by R.G. Collingwood and R.P. Wright with an addendum by R.S.O. Tomlin. It was first published in 1965, with a new edition in 1995.

Volume II contains, broadly speaking, the inscriptions found on instrumentum domesticum (domestic utensils).

Volume III (edited by R.S.O. Tomlin, R.P. Wright, and M.W.C. Hassall) is a continuation of Volume I, containing all the lapidary inscriptions found from the closing date of Volume I up to 31 December 2006.

There are also indexes published to the volumes allowing the scholar quickly to reference nomina and cognomina, military units, imperial titles, emperors and consuls, deities and so forth. Entries are also cross-referenced to the CIL and other indexes and journals as necessary.

References to RIB entries are usually written in the simple form: for example,  refers to entry 1726 in volume I, which in this particular case is a part of an altar with the inscription "". This inscription is shown here with the critical marks from the RIB intact.

See also 
Roman Imperial Coinage

References
 Collingwood, R.G. and Wright, R.P. (1965). The Roman Inscriptions of Britain, I, Inscriptions on Stone. Oxford, Clarendon Press.
 Tomlin, R.S.O. (1995). Addenda and Corrigenda to RIB I, in Collingwood and Wright 1965 (new edition 1995). Stroud, Alan Sutton Publishing Ltd.
 Collingwood, R.G. and Wright, R.P. (1990–95). The Roman Inscriptions of Britain, II: Instrumentum Domesticum (in eight fascicules), Frere, S.S. and Tomlin, R.S.O. (eds.). Oxford.
 Tomlin, R.S.O., Wright, R.P., and Hassall, M.W.C. (2009). The Roman Inscriptions of Britain, III: Inscriptions on Stone, found or notified between 1 January 1955 and 31 December 2006. Oxford, Oxbow Books.

External links
 RIB Online (an EpiDoc-based corpus compiled by Scott Vanderbilt).
 The Roman Inscriptions of Britain: An Epitome (without translations, drawings or cross-references).

1965 non-fiction books
British non-fiction books
Britain
Roman Britain